Echo is an unincorporated community in Armstrong County, Pennsylvania, United States.

History
A post office called Echo was established in 1857 and remained in operation until 1940. According to tradition, the community was named from the echoes bouncing off nearby ridges.

References

Unincorporated communities in Armstrong County, Pennsylvania
Unincorporated communities in Pennsylvania